The women's sprint at the 2018 Commonwealth Games was part of the cycling programme, which took place on 6 April 2018.

Records
Prior to this competition, the existing world and Games records were as follows:

Schedule
The schedule is as follows:

All times are Australian Eastern Standard Time (UTC+10)

Results

Qualifying
All 16 riders will be seeded for the 1/8 finals according to their times in qualification.

1/8 Finals
Heat winners advance to the quarterfinals.

Quarterfinals
Matches are extended to a best-of-three format hereon; winners proceed to the semifinals.

Semifinals
Winners proceed to the gold medal final; losers proceed to the bronze medal final.

Finals
The final classification is determined in the medal finals.

References

Women's sprint
Cycling at the Commonwealth Games – Women's sprint
Comm